Irmas is a surname and may refer to:

Audrey Irmas, American philanthropist and art collector
Matthew Irmas, American film director and producer
Sydney M. Irmas (c. 1925 – 1996), American attorney, investor, philanthropist, art collector

See also
IRMA (disambiguation)
IRMS (disambiguation)
Irma (disambiguation)